The Cachoplistinae is a subfamily of crickets (Orthoptera: Ensifera) of the family Phalangopsidae; they are sometimes called beetle crickets.  Species are terrestrial, carnivorous or omnivorous and can be found in: Africa, tropical Asia, Korea and Japan.

Nomenclature
The names for this subfamily and the tribe Cachoplistini, are based on Saussure's (1877) genus "Cachoplistus" and priority for family-group names based on his use of "Cachoplistites".  The agreed type genus is Cacoplistes, but "Cacoplistinae" has been superseded; the first use of Cachoplistinae was by Chopard (1968).

Tribes and Genera
The Orthoptera Species File lists two tribes:
Cachoplistini Saussure, 1877
 Cacoplistes Brunner von Wattenwyl, 1873

Homoeogryllini
Authority: Gorochov, 1986
 Homoeogryllus Guérin-Méneville, 1847
 Meloimorpha Walker, 1870

References

External links
 
 

Orthoptera subfamilies
Ensifera
crickets
Orthoptera of Asia